Iridana incredibilis, the incredible sapphire gem, is a butterfly in the family Lycaenidae. It is found in Sierra Leone, Liberia, Ivory Coast, Ghana, southern Nigeria, Cameroon, the Democratic Republic of the Congo and Uganda. The habitat consists of forests.

Adults are on wing in September, November and January.

The larval host plant is unknown, but both larvae and pupae were found on the bark of Alstonia congensis. They live on the bark in the company of ants of the genus Crematogaster. The larvae spin a silk shelter for themselves over a crack in the bark. Pupal cases have also been found on Albizia lebbeck.

References

External links

Die Gross-Schmetterlinge der Erde 13: Die Afrikanischen Tagfalter. Plate XIII 65 c

Butterflies described in 1891
Poritiinae
Butterflies of Africa